Dimitrios "Dimitris" Kompodietas (alternate spelling: Kobodietas) (born April 26, 1985) is a Greek professional basketball player for Palaio Faliro B.C. of the Greek B Basket League. He is a 1.96 m (6'5") tall shooting guard-small forward.

Professional career
Kompodietas began playing basketball with the junior teams of Ano Liosia. He began his pro career with Doukas, in the Greek 2nd Division, during the 2003–04 season. He moved back to Ano Liosia for the 2004–05 season.

He then moved to Alimos, where he again played in the Greek 2nd Division, during the 2005–06 season. He then joined Ilysiakos, where he played again in the Greek 2nd Division, for the next two seasons. He next moved to the 2nd-tier EuroCup team Panellinios.

He then played with Kolossos, Peristeri, and Nea Kifissia in the Greek 1st Division, before signing with the Greek 2nd Division club Faros Keratsiniou.

In 2018, he joined the Greek A2 League club Ionikos Nikaias.

On February 5, 2022, Kompodietas signed with Palaio Faliro B.C.

National team career
Kompodietas was a member of the Greek university national team that played at the 2009 World University Games. He was also a member of the Greek military national team that won the silver medal at the 2012 World Military Championship.

References

External links
EuroCup Profile
FIBA Europe Profile
FIBA Game Center Profile
Eurobasket.com Profile
Greek Basket League Profile 
Draftexpress.com Profile
BBasket.com Profile

1985 births
Living people
Amyntas B.C. players
Doukas B.C. players
Faros Keratsiniou B.C. players
Greek men's basketball players
Holargos B.C. players
Ilysiakos B.C. players
Ionikos Nikaias B.C. players
Kolossos Rodou B.C. players
Nea Kifissia B.C. players
Panellinios B.C. players
Peristeri B.C. players
Shooting guards
Small forwards
Sportspeople from Karditsa